The Rostock tramway network is a network of tramways forming the centrepiece of the public transport system in Rostock, the largest city in the federal state of Mecklenburg-Vorpommern, Germany.

Opened in 1881 as a horsecar system, the network was converted to electrical operation in 1904.

Lines 
, the network had six lines, as follows:

See also
List of town tramway systems in Germany
Trams in Germany

References

External links

 
 

Rostock
Rostock
Rail transport in Rostock
Transport in Rostock
Rostock
750 V DC railway electrification